The 1992 Seattle Seahawks season was the team's 17th season with the National Football League (NFL). This was the first of three seasons in Seattle for head coach Tom Flores, but the Seahawks' winning percentage (.125) remains the worst in franchise history.

The Seahawks' 140 points (8.8 points per game) scored in the regular season is the lowest total for any team playing a 16-game season. Long-time quarterback Dave Krieg had left Seattle for the rival Kansas City Chiefs in the offseason, leaving Seattle with Kelly Stouffer, Stan Gelbaugh, and Dan McGwire (brother of Major League Baseball star Mark McGwire) as their three quarterbacks.

Football Outsiders called Seattle's 1992 offense "the worst offense in (their ranking system's) history." Seattle's 1,778 passing yards are the fewest in a season by any team during the 1990s. Seattle was so inept that from the first game of the season until their Week 13 overtime win over Denver, they collectively had fewer points scored than punts attempted; for the entire season, the team finished with only slightly more points than punts. The team failed to score more than 17 points in a single game.

Despite their historically inept offense, Football Outsiders also ranked Seattle as having the third-best defense in 1992, making them the most imbalanced team they had ever measured. The Seahawks' star defensive tackle Cortez Kennedy was named the 1992 NFL Defensive Player of the Year. Seattle gave up the fourth-fewest passing yards (2,661), and tied for fewest passing touchdowns allowed (11) of any team in 1992.

Before their Monday Night Football victory over the Denver Broncos in the Kingdome in late November, the Seahawks honored radio announcer Pete Gross, inducting him as the fourth member of the Ring of Honor, its first non-player. After his long bout with cancer, Gross died two days later at age 55. That game was also the last MNF game played in the Kingdome and the last in Seattle until 2002.

Offseason

NFL Draft

Undrafted free agents

Personnel

Staff

Final roster

     Starters in bold.
 (*) Denotes players that were selected for the 1993 Pro Bowl.

Schedule

Preseason

Source: Seahawks Media Guides

Regular season
Divisional matchups have the AFC West playing the NFC East.

Standings

Game Summaries

Preseason

Week P1: vs. Los Angeles Rams

Week P2: at Indianapolis Colts

Week P3: vs. Phoenix Cardinals

Week P4: at San Francisco 49ers

Regular season

Week 1: vs. Cincinnati Bengals

Week 2: at Kansas City Chiefs

Week 3: at New England Patriots

Week 4: vs. Miami Dolphins

Week 5: at San Diego Chargers

Week 6: at Dallas Cowboys

Week 7: vs. Los Angeles Raiders

Week 8: at New York Giants

Week 10: vs. Washington Redskins

Week 11: at Los Angeles Raiders

Week 12: vs. Kansas City Chiefs

Week 13: vs. Denver Broncos

Week 14: at Pittsburgh Steelers

Week 15: vs. Philadelphia Eagles

Week 16: at Denver Broncos

Week 17: vs. San Diego Chargers

Notes

References

External links
 Seahawks draft history at NFL.com
 1992 NFL season results at NFL.com

Seattle
Seattle Seahawks seasons
Seattle